Literary Reflections (1993) was written by American author James A. Michener.

A compilation of previously published materials with updates and an Introduction written by Mr. Michener in 1993.

Chapter Summary

1. Collectors, Forgers — And A Writer: A Memoir
65 pages. Originally published by Targ Editions in 1983.
A discussion of Mr. Michener's college years and some acquaintances and works that still influenced him later in his life and career.

2. Testimony
25 pages. Originally published by A. Grove Day of White Knight Press in 1983.
A discussion of his self-education on how to write a novel and the books which most influenced his style.

3. Who Is Virgil T. Fry?
9 pages. Originally published in The Clearing House in October 1941, with a foreword written by Mr. Michener in 1993.
Michener's first published work of fiction.
Unlike his later work, much of the action is told through dialog.
The main character was also the basis for the main character in "Tales Of The South Pacific".

4. Verses To A Writer Heading For Ninety
4 pages. Original to this book. 1993

5. Opinions On Other Writers

Ernest Hemingway
Introduction to "The Dangerous Summer" Originally published by Scribers in 1985 and updated for this book by Mr. Michener in 1993.

Margaret Mitchell
Introduction to the 1975 Anniversary Edition of "Gone With The Wind". Originally published by Macmillan in 1975.

Marcus Goodrich
Afterward to a reprint of "Delilah" published by Southern Illinois University Press in 1977 and updated for this book by Mr. Michener in 1993.

Truman Capote
Foreword to "Conversations With Capote" written by Lawrence Grobel and Originally published by New American Library in 1985.

References

1993 non-fiction books
American non-fiction books
Books by James A. Michener